In 2008, the Campeonato Brasileiro Série C, the third division of the Brazilian League, was contested by 64 clubs, four of which qualified to the Série B. For the second time in history, Atlético Goianiense were crowned Série C champions. Following them, former Série A champions Guarani were also promoted, along with Campinense and Duque de Caxias. The new, revamped 20-club round robin Série C in 2009, will be contested by the clubs which finished from 5th to 20th this season, plus the four relegated from Série B 2008.

Competition format

First stage
The 64 teams play in 16 groups of four. Within each group, the four teams play a double round robin, i.e. they play each other in home and away matches, totalling six matchdays. The two best ranked teams in each group qualify to the Second Stage.

Second stage
The 32 teams qualified from the First Stage play in eight groups of four. Within each group, the four teams play a double round robin, i.e. they play each other in home and away matches, totalling six matchdays. The two best ranked teams in each group qualify to the Third Stage.

Third stage
The 16 teams qualified from the Second Stage play in four groups of four. Within each group, the four teams play a double round robin, i.e. they play each other in home and away matches, totalling six matchdays. The two best ranked teams in each group qualify to the Final Stage.

Final stage
The eight teams qualified from the Third Stage are put together in a single group. They play a double round robin, i.e. they play each other in home and away matches, totalling fourteen matchdays. The four best ranked teams are automatically promoted to the Série B in 2009.

Teams
Sorted by state. Each state federation has its own criteria to indicate a club to this tournament. Only teams which do not take place in Série A and Série B are being considered.

1 State Championship winners Trem withdrew.
2 State Championship runners-up Rio Bananal withdrew.
3 2007 Taça Minas Gerais champions Ituiutaba and runners-up Tupi qualified via Campeonato Mineiro.
4 Ypiranga withdrew.
5 2007 Copa FGF winners Caxias qualified via Campeonato Gaúcho.
6 Ulbra withdrew and no other team was interested in the vacancy.

Results

First stage

Group 1 (AC-AM-MT)

Group 2 (AP-AM-PA-RR)

Group 3 (MA-PA-TO)

Group 4 (CE-MA-PI)

Group 5 (PB-PE-RN)

Group 6 (CE-PB-PE-RN)

Group 7 (AL-BA-PE-SE)

Group 8 (AL-BA-SE)

Group 9 (GO-MT-MS)

Group 10 (DF-GO)

Group 11 (ES-MG-RJ-SP)

Group 12 (ES-RJ-SP)

Group 13 (MG-SP)

Group 14 (RJ-SP)

Group 15 (PR-RS-SC)

Group 16 (PR-RS-SC)

Second stage

Group 17 (AC-AM-MT-PA)

Group 18 (MA-PA-PI)

Group 19 (CE-PB-PI)

Group 20 (AL-BA-SE)

Group 21 (DF-GO-MT)

Group 22 (MG-RJ-SP)

Group 23 (MG-SP)

Group 24 (PR-RS-SC)

Third stage

Group 25 (AC-MT-PA)

Group 26 (AL-PB-PE-SE)

Group 27 (GO-MT-RJ-SP)

Group 28 (MG-RS-SC-SP)

Final stage (AC-GO-PA-PB-RJ-RS-SP-SE)

Qualification to Série C 2009
In 2009, Série C will have a new format and the number of teams will be reduced from 64 to only 20 clubs. Teams finished from 5th to 20th are qualified to next season, meanwhile the ones finished from the 21st-place will have to qualify via state competitions to play Série D in 2009.

See also
Série A 2008
Série B 2008
Copa do Brasil 2008

References

External links
Official site - Classification 
Official site - Games 

3
Campeonato Brasileiro Série C seasons